The Giardino Alpino "Antonio Segni" (5,000 m2) is an alpine botanical garden located at 1,714 meters altitude in Refugio Vazzoler, Gruppo del Civetta, Col Negro di Pelsa, Taibon Agordino, Province of Belluno, Veneto, Italy. It is privately owned with a municipal affiliation, and open daily when Refugio Vazzoler is open.

The garden was established in 1968 in the Dolomites, and named after Italian President Antonio Segni (1891-1972). Its mission is to educate hikers and the general public about the most important species of trees, shrubs, and grasses of the Alps and Dolomites, particularly those of the garden's local environment near the Massif Moiazza-Civetta.

The garden consists of natural areas, man-made wetlands, and three small rock gardens. Its collections include Epilobium angustifolium, Larix decidua, Picea abies, and other alpine vegetation.

See also 
 List of botanical gardens in Italy

References 
 Listolade description, 23-05-07 (Italian)
 Caiconegliano description (Italian)
 BGCI entry
 Horti entry (Italian)
 L'Italia dei giardini, Touring Club Italiano, Touring Editore, 2005, page 59. .

Botanical gardens in Italy
Gardens in Veneto